Cellobiohydrolase may refer to:
 Cellulase, an enzyme
 Cellulose 1,4-beta-cellobiosidase, an enzyme